Roger Alberto Serrano Ruíz  (born 23 July 1970 in Chepén) is a former Peruvian footballer.

Club career
Serrano has played for most of his career with Universitario de Deportes, Sport Boys, Sporting Cristal, Alianza Lima and Cienciano in the Primera División Peruana.

International career
Serrano made 16 appearances for the senior Peru national football team from 1996 to 2000.

References

External links

1970 births
Living people
People from Chepén Province
Association football midfielders
Peruvian footballers
Peru international footballers
León de Huánuco footballers
Club Universitario de Deportes footballers
Ciclista Lima Association footballers
Deportivo Sipesa footballers
Sport Boys footballers
Sporting Cristal footballers
Cienciano footballers
Deportivo Municipal footballers
Club Alianza Lima footballers